Shikshanacha Aaicha Gho is a 2010 Indian Marathi film directed by Mahesh Manjrekar starring Sachin Khedekar, Bharat Jadhav, Saksham Kulkarni, Gauri Vaidya, Siddharth Jadhav and Kranti Redkar. The film was released on 15 January 2010. The film's music was composed by the trio Ajit-Atul-Sameer. After Astitva with 9 years long gap Mahesh Manjrekar directed Marathi film. This film was later remade in Tamil & Telugu as Dhoni, in Bengali as "Chalo Paltai" and in Punjabi as Son of Manjeet Singh

Synopsis 
Shrinivas Rane, is an average student, born with average academic intelligence, but when it comes to cricket he is a born genius. His extraordinary talent was lost on his father who like millions of other parents believed that a child's intellect is only reflected in their mark sheet, which eventually will give them a "secure future". So he begins his quest to make his son the brightest and best student in the world. But Shree can’t handle this pressure and it reflects on his psyche deteriorating the relation between father and son, upon which the father in a fit of anger does something which makes him repent later.

Cast 
 Sachin Khedekar ..... CM
 Bharat Jadhav.....Madhukar Rane
 Saksham Kulkarni .....Shrinivas Rane-Son
 Gauri Vaidya..Durga Rane-Daughter
 Siddharth Jadhav......Ebrahim Bhai
 Kranti Redkar.......Nalini
 Mahesh Manjrekar......Doctor

Production 
Shikshanacha Aaicha Gho was released in India on 15 January 2010.

Music 
Marathi music trio Ajit-Atul-Sameer scored the music. The soundtrack was released on 5 December 2009.

Controversy 
Maratha Mahasangh took an objection over the name "aaiycha". According to them, it was abusive and would have an adverse effect on children. Later Manjrekar agreed to make particular announcement before starting of film and dispute ends.

Remake
Prakash Raj remade this movie in Tamil & Telugu As "Dhoni". It was speculated Mahesh Manjarekar wanted to remake this movie in Hindi with Bollywood actor Salman Khan in lead. Later Salman Khan passed the role to Sonu Sood after sustaining injury while participating in CCL.

References

External links
 Official site of the Movie

2010 films
Films about the education system in India
Marathi films remade in other languages
2010s Marathi-language films
Films directed by Mahesh Manjrekar